Myo Zaw Oo (born 21 October 1992) is a footballer from Burma, and a midfielder for the Myanmar national football team and Myanmar U-22 .

References

1992 births
Living people
Burmese footballers
Myanmar international footballers
Magway FC players
Association football forwards